The Clover Park School District (CPSD) is the fourth largest school district in Pierce County, Washington, United States, and the 28th largest public school district in the state.

Location
The Clover Park School District is located directly south of Tacoma, Washington in the city of Lakewood. The district includes  within the western area of Pierce County.

CPSD serves the majority of Lakewood, North Fort Lewis, the Joint Base Lewis-McChord community (the district boundary includes almost all of the boundary of Fort Lewis and much of the McChord Field territory), and portions of Parkland and Tacoma.

Schools
Clover Park is composed of 17 elementary schools, four middle schools, two high schools, one alternative high school and Harrison Preparatory School (grades 6-12). The district also serves two specialty schools within Western State Hospital.

Starting with the 2009-2010 school year, Harrison Prep offered grades 6 through 12 only, to allow for an International Baccalaureate (Middle Years Program).

Demographics
On average, the CPSD student body is approximately 39.66% Caucasian, 13.05% African American, 27.85% Hispanic, 4.53% Asian American, and .83% Native American.

Racial discipline policy
Data from Washington schools indicated that black students were disciplined more often than white students. "Are you dispersing discipline across the ethnicities, the racial groups, equitably", asked a district superintendent, "are you disciplining African-American boys more than you're disciplining white boys?" <

Military influence
There has been a significant military influence within the district due to its proximity to Joint Base Lewis-McChord. Each of its two senior high schools are home to two Junior Reserve Officers' Training Corps (JROTC) programs. Clover Park High School has an Air Force JROTC program, and Lakes High School has an Army JROTC program.

About 31% of students within the district live on a military base while 40% are funded military dependents. From 1985 to 2011, there have been 90 appointments to military academies from CPSD.

References

External links
 Clover Park School District website 

School districts in Washington (state)
Lakewood, Washington
Education in Pierce County, Washington